Near North is a neighborhood within the larger Near North community on the north side of Minneapolis directly north of the more industrial and historic neighborhoods of Minneapolis, the Warehouse District. It is one of Minneapolis’s historically Black neighborhoods. 

It is bordered by the Hawthorne and Jordan neighborhoods to the north, St. Anthony West to the east, North Loop, Sumner-Glenwood, and Harrison to the south, and Willard-Hay to the west.

Historic structures 
The neighborhood contains three buildings listed on the National Register of Historic Places:
 Minneapolis Public Library, North Branch
 Sumner Community Library
 John Lohmar House

See also 

 Neighborhoods of Minneapolis

References

External links
Minneapolis Neighborhood Profile - Near North
InsideNorthside, North Minneapolis Encyclopedia

Neighborhoods in Minneapolis